Upsilon Andromedae c (υ Andromedae c, abbreviated Upsilon And c, υ And c), formally named Samh  (a homophone with the star Salm), is an extrasolar planet orbiting the Sun-like star Upsilon Andromedae A every 241.3 days at an average distance of . Its discovery in April 1999 by Geoffrey Marcy and R. Paul Butler made this the first multiple-planet system to be discovered around a main-sequence star, and the first multiple-planet system known in a multiple star system. Upsilon Andromedae c is the second known planet in order of distance from its star.

Name
In July 2014 the International Astronomical Union launched NameExoWorlds, a process for giving proper names to certain exoplanets and their host stars. The process involved public nomination and voting for the new names. In December 2015, the IAU announced the winning name was Samh for this planet. The winning name was submitted by the Vega Astronomy Club of Morocco and honours the 11th Century astronomer Ibn al-Samh of Muslim Spain.

Discovery
Upsilon Andromedae c was detected by measuring variations in its star's radial velocity as a result of the planet's gravity. This was done by making precise measurements of the Doppler shift of the spectrum of Upsilon Andromedae A. At the time of discovery, Upsilon Andromedae A was already known to host one extrasolar planet, the hot Jupiter Upsilon Andromedae b, however by 1999 it was clear that the inner planet could not explain the velocity curve.

In 1999, astronomers at both San Francisco State University and the Harvard-Smithsonian Center for Astrophysics independently concluded that a three-planet model best fit the data. The two new planets were designated Upsilon Andromedae c and Upsilon Andromedae d.

Orbit and mass
Like the majority of long-period extrasolar planets, the orbit of Upsilon Andromedae c is eccentric, more so than any of the major planets in the Solar System (including Pluto). If placed in the Solar System, Upsilon Andromedae c would lie between the orbits of Earth and Venus.

The high orbital eccentricity may be the result of gravitational perturbations from the planet Upsilon Andromedae d. Simulations suggest that the orbit of Upsilon Andromedae c returns to its original circular state roughly once every 9,000 years.

One proposal is that interactions between Upsilon Andromedae d and a (now lost) outer planet moved Upsilon Andromedae d into an orbit closer to the star, where it gradually caused the orbit of Upsilon Andromedae c to become eccentric. If so, the rogue planet would have had to eject immediately.

A limitation of the radial velocity method used to detect Upsilon Andromedae c is that the orbital inclination is unknown, and only a lower limit on the planet's mass can be obtained.  However, by combining radial velocity measurements from ground-based telescopes with astrometric data from the Hubble Space Telescope, astronomers have determined the orbital inclination as well as the actual mass of Upsilon Andromedae c, which is about 13.98 times the mass of Jupiter. The mutual inclination between c and d is 29.9 degrees.

Characteristics
Given the planet's high mass, it is likely that Upsilon Andromedae c is a gas giant with no solid surface. Since the planet has only been detected indirectly through observations of its star, properties such as its radius, composition, and temperature are unknown.

Since its actual mass is approximately 14 times that of Jupiter, and its star's metallicity is similar to that of the Sun, Upsilon Andromedae c may actually be a small brown dwarf, but this may not be the case.

See also
 Eccentric Jupiter

References

Upsilon Andromedae
Exoplanets discovered in 1999
Giant planets
Exoplanets detected by radial velocity
Exoplanets detected by astrometry
Exoplanets with proper names